Eugnathogobius illotus is a species of goby native to marine, brackish and fresh waters of Singapore, Thailand, Brunei and the Philippines.

Taxonomy
This species was initially placed in genus Calamiana with the name C. illota.  Later research treated Calamiana as a junior synonym of Eugnathogobius; consequently, the species has been classified in the genus Eugnathogobius with the name E. illotus as of 2009. This has been followed by FishBase and IUCN.

References

Gobionellinae
Fish described in 1999
Taxa named by Helen K. Larson